Igor Viktorovich Makarov (born 5 April 1962 Ashkhabad, Turkmen SSR, Soviet Union) is the President of ARETI International Group (formerly known as ITERA International Group). A former professional cyclist and member of the USSR national cycling team, Igor Makarov has, since his retirement from competition, been a key supporter and sponsor of international cycling and serves on the UCI Management Committee since 2011. In June 2022, Forbes estimated Makarov's net worth at $2.1 billion.

Early life
Makarov was born as the only child of his parents in Ashkhabad, Turkmen SSR in 1962.

From 1979 to 1986, Makarov was a cyclist for the Soviet team, winning medals and awards, and became acquainted with Saparmurat Niyazov or Turkmenbashy who ruled the Turkmen Soviet Socialist Republic and later Turkmenistan from 1985 to 2006.

He graduated from Turkmen State University in 1983, then served in the Soviet Army.

The name ARETI is derived from Makarov's previous company's name ITERA (spelled backwards). In the summer of 2017, Makarov's new yacht, Areti, was delivered by Lürssen.

Career
ITERA Oil and Gas Company, founded in 1992 by Igor Makarov with headquarters in Jacksonville, Florida and was the main subsidiary of the ITERA Group.  Makarov purchased a mansion in the 1990s in Jacksonville, Florida, where ITERA was headquartered. Due to enormous reserves, Makarov's Itera was the fourth largest natural gas company in the world in 2000. In 2012, ITERA entered into a joint venture with Rosneft and a year later, Rosneft acquired Itera Oil and Gas Company for $2.9 billion. In 2015, ITERA International Group of Companies was renamed ARETI International Group as a result of rebranding.

According to undisclosed documents obtained by a journalist of Eurasia Daily Monitor in 2009, Makarov was the Ultimate Beneficial Owner (UBO) of companies affiliated with the then company ITERA, many of which allegedly registered in the British Virgin Islands (BVI) and other offshore tax havens. He was one of many individuals with Russian business interests named as ‘oligarchs’ in the CAATSA unclassified report, signed into law by President Donald Trump in 2017, even though he believed the legislation was "seriously flawed". The list imposed no new sanctions and shortly after it was released, it was reported and confirmed by the Treasury Department that it was copied from the Forbes’ 2017 “World Billionaires” list.

Cycling
Makarov was a member of the USSR national cycling team, champion and prizewinner of the all-Union (USSR) and international cycling competitions. Makarov is also a Master of Sports of International Class.

He actively supports and sponsors the international cycling movement. From 2010 to 2016, he was President of the Russian Cycling Federation (RCF) and in 2016 was elected as Honorary President of the Russian Cycling Federation. In March 2011, Makarov became a member of the Management Committee of the International Cycling Union, UCI. The team Katusha was created by him in 2008 within the framework of the previously established Russian Global Cycling Project, which was intended to help cycling in Russia to move to a qualitatively new level. Oleg Tinkov's cycling team Tinkoff Credit Systems disbanded in 2008 and transferred its structure to form Katusha.

Awards
Makarov has been decorated with state awards from different countries for his significant contributions to developing economic relations and strengthening friendship and cooperation between the people. Among the awards are the Order of Friendship of Peoples and the Medal of Francisk Scorina (state awards of Belarus), the Friendship Medal (state award of Mongolia), the Order "Gloria Muncii" (Work Merit) (the state award of Moldova), as well as the Order of Holy Faithful Prince Daniel of Moscow and Innokenty the Sanctifier Metropolitan of Moscow and Kolomna, 3rd Class of the Russian Orthodox Church, the Order of Saint Sergius of Radonezh, 3rd Class of the Russian Orthodox Church, Honorary Reward "Аkinfy Nikitich Demidov" of the International Demidov's Foundation.

Community service
Makarov has created the charitable Makarov Foundation to support children's welfare and people with autism and other developmental disabilities. Makarov, through his foundation, has given a grant to build the Mount Sinai Adult Autism Clinic, supported the Best Buddies International’s annual Hublot Best Buddies Challenge: Miami and the annual Tour de Broward 2020, which raised more than $700,000 for the Joe DiMaggio Children's Hospital. In addition, Makarov also donated money to the Flight of Hope Project to save the population of Siberian cranes.

Notes

References

1962 births
Russian energy industry businesspeople
Russian male cyclists
Soviet male cyclists
Turkmenistan male cyclists
Recipients of the Order of Francysk Skaryna
Recipients of the Order of Work Glory
Living people
Sportspeople from Ashgabat
Turkmen State University alumni